Dilsen-Stokkem is a city and municipality located in the Belgian province of Limburg. On January 1, 2018, Dilsen-Stokkem had a total population of 20,454. The total area is 65.61 km² which gives a population density of 312 inhabitants per km².

The municipality consists of the following sub-municipalities: Dilsen, Elen, Lanklaar, Rotem, and Stokkem.

Notable people of Dilsen-Stokkem
 Luca Brecel (born 8 March 1995), professional snooker player
 Sonja Doumen (Miss Belgium 1968)
 Jacky Mathijssen (born 20 July 1963), football player and manager
 Jos Vaessen (born 21 March 1944)

References

External links
 
  Official website

Municipalities of Limburg (Belgium)